Arsenio Iglesias Pardo (born 24 December 1930) is a Spanish former football forward and manager.

Nicknamed O Bruxo de Arteixo ("The Wizard of Arteixo"), his professional career, which spanned more than four decades, was closely associated to Deportivo as both a player and manager.

Playing career
Born in Arteixo, Province of A Coruña, Iglesias started his career with local side Deportivo de La Coruña. He made his La Liga debut on 28 October 1951 in a 6–1 away loss against FC Barcelona, and scored the following weekend against RCD Español (3–1 home win).

Iglesias netted seven goals in three separate seasons for the Galicians, adding a career-best eight in 1956–57, which nonetheless ended in relegation. In six of the following eight years he also played in the top division, representing Sevilla FC, Granada CF and Real Oviedo; he amassed competition totals of 238 games and 50 goals, and retired at 35 after a spell in the lower leagues with Albacete Balompié.

Coaching career
Iglesias started coaching one year after retiring, his first appointment being at Deportivo's reserves, which he accumulated with assistant duties in the main squad. Midway through the 1970–71 campaign he was named the first team's manager, leading them to a top-flight promotion and being relegated in 1973.

In 1973–74, Iglesias repeated the feat with another Segunda División side, Hércules CF, then remained at the club's helm for a further three years, always managing to comfortably stay afloat – this included a fifth place in 1975 and a sixth in 1976. In the 1977–78 season another promotion to the main division befell, this time as champions with Real Zaragoza.

Iglesias worked in the top tier in two of the next three seasons, leading Burgos CF to the 13th position in 1978–79 and being fired by AD Almería midway through the 1980–81 campaign amid several internal disputes. In 1982 he returned to Deportivo, with the club in division two.

In 1987–88, Iglesias was one of three coaches as Depor nearly suffered relegation to Segunda División B, being saved by a last-minute goal against Racing de Santander. He was again reinstated as first-team manager, finally attaining promotion to the first division in 1991 after ranking second.

Iglesias replaced the dismissed Marco Antonio Boronat at the club's helm late in 1991–92, as Deportivo had to play a relegation playoff against Real Betis, eventually winning 2–1 on aggregate. In the following seasons, however, Super Depor came to fruition, with several team players winning individual accolades and being called to the Spain national team as the side finished three consecutive campaigns in the top three; during this timeframe, he was named Manager of the Year three times, twice by Don Balón and once by El País.

Iglesias retired from football after 1994–95. Midway through the following campaign, however, he accepted an offer from Real Madrid to replace the fired Jorge Valdano, with the Merengues finally ranking sixth and being eliminated in the quarter-finals of the UEFA Champions League by eventual winners Juventus FC.

In 2005, Iglesias was appointed manager of the Galicia autonomous football team, working alongside Fernando Vázquez. In the previous decade, he also worked as a sports commentator.

In 2016, Iglesias was bestowed with the highest recognition of Deportivo, a special insignia, and was declared "Blue and White Legend". The event took place at halftime of the last game of the 2015–16 season, at the Estadio Riazor.

Honours

Manager
Zaragoza
Segunda División: 1977–78

Deportivo
Copa del Rey: 1994–95

References

External links

1930 births
Living people
People from A Coruña (comarca)
Sportspeople from the Province of A Coruña
Spanish footballers
Footballers from Galicia (Spain)
Association football forwards
La Liga players
Segunda División players
Deportivo Fabril players
Deportivo de La Coruña players
Sevilla FC players
Granada CF footballers
Real Oviedo players
Albacete Balompié players
Spanish football managers
La Liga managers
Segunda División managers
Tercera División managers
Deportivo de La Coruña managers
Hércules CF managers
Real Zaragoza managers
Burgos CF (1936) managers
Elche CF managers
SD Compostela managers
Real Madrid CF managers